Rhodopteriana soricis is a moth in the  family Eupterotidae. It was described by Rothschild in 1917. It is found in Ghana and Sierra Leone.

References

Janinae
Moths described in 1917